Händer is the fourth full-length album by progressive rock band Kaipa.

Track listing
 "Äntligen" - 5:25
 "Händer" - 6:12
 "Regn" - 5:42
 "Staden lever" - 4:14
 "Elgrandi" - 2:38
 "Krig" - 5:05
 "Älska med mig igen" - 6:45
 "Med trasiga segel" - 4:55

Personnel
 Mats Löfgren - vocals
 Max Åhman - guitars
 Hans Lundin - synthesizer, vocals, piano
 Mats Lindberg - bass
 Ingemar Bergman - drums, vocals

1980 albums
Kaipa albums